220 most commonly refers to:

 220 (number), a number
 220 AD, a year
 220 BC, a year

220 may also refer to:

Military
 220 (Searchlight) Field Squadron, Royal Engineers, a squadron of the Royal Air Force
 No. 220 Squadron IAF, a fighter squadron of the Indian Air Force
 No. 220 Squadron RAF, a squadron of the Royal Air Force

Music
 220 (album), a 1996 instrumental album by Phil Keaggy
 220 (EP), a 2018 extended play by Snoop Doog
 "220" (song), a 2008 song by t.A.T.u.
 220 Kid (born 1989), an English record producer and DJ

Places
 Area code 220, a telephone area code in Ohio, United States
 220 Central Park South, a residential building in New York City, New York, United States
 220 West 57th Street, a building in New York City, New York, United States
 220th Street (Manhattan), a street in New York City, New York, United States
 220 East 42nd Street, also known as Daily News Building, a skyscraper in New York City, New York, United States
 220 East Illinois, also known as Optima Signature, a residential skyscraper in Chicago, Illinois, United States

Science and technology
 220 Stephania, a minor planet
 NGC 220, an open cluster

Transportation
 220 (MBTA bus), an MBTA bus route in Boston, Massachusetts, United States
 List of highways numbered 220
 DAF LF, a 2001–present British light/medium duty truck, sold in the United States as the Peterbilt 220
 Mercedes-Benz 220 (disambiguation), multiple German automobile models

Other uses
 UFC 220, a 2018 martial arts event in Boston, Massachusetts, United States